Tikhonravov is a large, eroded crater in the Arabia quadrangle of Mars. Tikhonravov is believed to have once held a giant lake that drained into the  Naktong-Scamander-Mamers lake-chain system. An inflow and outflow channel has been identified. Many craters once contained lakes.

Pedestal craters 

Some craters in Tikhonravov are classified as pedestal craters. A pedestal crater is a crater with its ejecta sitting above the surrounding terrain. They form when an impact crater ejects material which forms an erosion resistant layer, thus causing the immediate area to erode more slowly than the rest of the region. The result is that both the crater and its ejecta blanket stand above the surroundings.

See also 
 List of craters on Mars

References 

Arabia quadrangle
Impact craters on Mars